Big Band Theory is an album by the American composer, bandleader and keyboardist Carla Bley, recorded and released on the Watt/ECM label in 1993.

Reception
The AllMusic review by Scott Yanow stated that "overall this set (which is enjoyable enough) is less memorable than one would expect from Carla Bley". The Penguin Guide to Jazz awarded it 3 stars, stating: "This never quite fulfils the promise of some exciting arrangements and a rah of hot solists".

Track listing
All compositions by Carla Bley except as indicated
 "On the Stage in Cages" - 12:39  
 "Birds of Paradise" - 20:21  
 "Goodbye Pork Pie Hat" (Charles Mingus) - 8:38  
 "Fresh Impression" - 7:39
Recorded at Angel Recording Studios, London on July 2 & 3, 1993.

Personnel
Carla Bley - piano
Alex Balanescu - violin  
Lew Soloff, Guy Barker, Claude Deppa, Steve Waterman - trumpet
Gary Valente, Richard Edwards, Annie Whitehead - trombone 
Ashley Slater - bass trombone
Roger Janotta - flute, soprano saxophone 
Wolfgang Puschnig - alto saxophone, flute  
Andy Sheppard - tenor saxophone, soprano saxophone
Pete Hurt tenor saxophone 
Julian Argüelles - baritone saxophone  
Karen Mantler - organ  
Steve Swallow - bass guitar  
Dennis Mackrel - drums

References

ECM Records albums
Carla Bley albums
1993 albums